Swinburne University of Technology (often simply called Swinburne) is a public research university based in Melbourne, Australia. It was founded in 1908 as the Eastern Suburbs Technical College by George Swinburne to serve those without access to further education in Melbourne's eastern suburbs. Its main campus is in Hawthorn, a suburb of Melbourne, 7.5 km from the Melbourne central business district.

In addition to its main Hawthorn campus, it has campuses in the Melbourne metropolitan area at Wantirna and Croydon; in Sarawak, Malaysia; and in Sydney.

In the 2020 Student Experience Survey, Swinburne was ranked equal 1st place in Victoria for the ’entire education experience’ for undergraduate students, with an overall satisfaction rate of 80 per cent. Swinburne is the only academic institution in Melbourne that offers pilot training from the aviation degrees.

History

Swinburne University of Technology has its origins in the Eastern Suburbs Technical College, which was established in 1908 in the Melbourne suburb of Hawthorn by George Swinburne. In 1913, the institution changed its name from Hawthorn College to Swinburne Technical College. It later became known as the Swinburne Institute of Technical And Further Education (TAFE), eventually shortened to Swinburne Institute of Technology.

In the late 1980s, the Outer Eastern University Planning Council advocated for a new university to be established in outer eastern Melbourne. The area had the second lowest university participation rate in Melbourne, after the Mornington Peninsula. Partially in response to this advocacy, in 1990 Swinburne established its "Eastern Campus" in Mooroolbark (sometimes described as Lilydale), on the site of the recently closed MDA Grammar School. However, students could not attend until 1992 due to council planning negotiation, and the campus was officially opened on 6 April 1992. By 1993, it was known as the "Mooroolbark Campus".

The Dawkins reforms to Australian higher education in the early 1990s lead to many tertiary colleges being merged or split-up, and many given university status.

On 1 January 1992, the university was given the Prahran Campus of Victoria College and the co-located Prahran College of TAFE, both of which had evolved from the Prahran Mechanics' Institute (established in 1854).

Swinburne attained university status on 1 July 1992 with the passage of the Swinburne University of Technology Act.

In 1997, Swinburne opened a campus at Lilydale, replacing its nearby one at Mooroolbark. In 1998, it merged with the Outer East Institute of TAFE and began operating from campuses at Croydon and Wantirna.

In 1999, Swinburne established the National Institute of Circus Arts (NICA).

In 2000, the university opened a campus in Sarawak, Malaysia, as a partnership between the university and the Sarawak State Government.

In 2008, it collaborated with two other universities in forming The Centre for Social Impact.  In February 2011, the university opened the Advanced Technologies Centre, a 22,000 square metre building of modern architectural design at its Hawthorn campus, known locally as "the cheese grater building".

Following a series of funding cuts announced by the Victorian Government to vocational education in May 2012, Swinburne announced that it would close its Lilydale and Prahran campuses. Lilydale campus officially closed on 1 July 2013. The university sold its Prahran campus to the Northern Melbourne Institute of TAFE in 2014. The Lilydale campus was taken over by Box Hill Institute in 2016.

In 2015, Swinburne launched its law school. Through a partnership with Leo Cussen Centre for Law, Swinburne Law School is the only law school in Victoria accredited by the Victorian Legal Admissions Board (VLAB) to enable students to accelerate their admission to legal practice by completing their practical legal training during the final year of their studies.

Campuses

Hawthorn
The Hawthorn campus is Swinburne's main campus. It hosts a range of vocational, undergraduate, and postgraduate programs.

Wantirna
Wantirna is a TAFE-specific campus. The campus also offers courses in areas including health and community services, visual arts, business and accounting.

Croydon
The university's Croydon campus is a TAFE-specific campus, with a focus on training in trades such as building, carpentry, electrical and plumbing.

Prahran
Swinburne no longer operates a "Prahran Campus" (occupying and replacing buildings of the previous by Prahran College). Currently it is the home of the National Institute of Circus Arts (NICA).

Sarawak, Malaysia
The Swinburne University of Technology Sarawak Campus is located in Kuching, Sarawak, Malaysia.

Parramatta
The Parramatta campus is quite small and located in a public library building as a tenant. It has connections to Sydney's bus, tram, metro and train networks as well as having a large taxi rank attached to the building.

Swinburne Online

Swinburne Online is the online arm of the university. Swinburne Online was founded in 2011 after a 50-50 joint venture between Swinburne University of Technology and SEEK Learning seeking to capitalise on increasing demand for off-campus education.

Swinburne Online was originally created under the name Swinburne Direct, with an initial $10 million investment. It was formed to maximise the Australian Government's decision to lift caps on Commonwealth-supported university places from 2012, a policy which intended to increase the number of 25- to 34-year-olds with bachelor's degrees to 40 per cent by 2025.

Swinburne Online originally provided higher education degrees at both bachelor and masters level. As of April 2015, it offered over twenty courses in business, communication, design, education, and social science. However, as of September 2015, Swinburne Online has begun offering vocational education.

In April 2015, CEO Denice Pitt expressed a public desire to expand internationally to offer degrees to international students.

In 2014 Swinburne Online was ranked fourth in Australia's 100 fastest growing companies. Its earnings before interest, tax, depreciation and amortisation grew by 48% to $29.8 million in 2014–15.

Research institutes and centres
, Swinburne has six research institutes:
Data Science Research Institute (launched 2017)
Iverson Health Innovation Research Institute (launched 2017)
Manufacturing Futures Research Institute (launched 2016)
Smart Cities Research Institute (launched 2017)
Social Innovation Research Institute (launched 2017)
Space Technology and Industry Institute (2021)

The Swinburne Institute for Social Research formerly (until 2017) existed within the Faculty of Health, Arts and Design, It included the Public Interest Journalism Foundation (PIJ Foundation), which produced YouComm News. As of 2020, PIJF has evolved into an independent organisation, now named Public Interest Journalistic Freedom, which is partially crowd-funded.

The Centre for Social Impact Swinburne (CSI Swin), established in 2014, is (was?) in the  Faculty of Business and Law. It is part of the national network that also includes the University of New South Wales, the University of Western Australia and Flinders University. There are many other research centres, including the Centre for Astrophysics and Supercomputing, the Centre for Mental Health, and the Centre for Human Psychopharmacology.

Academic profile

Rankings

Swinburne is internationally recognized 
for the output from international partnership research. Swinburne performed fairly well in the 2020 Global Nature Index ranking, especially when compared with universities in the Asia-Pacific region. According to the CWTS Leiden rankings in 2020, Swinburne ranked 2nd in the world for Mathematics and Computer Science. Swinburne ranked 10th in Australia in the 2020-2021 European Commission-sponsored global U-Multirank ranking, behind Australian National University.

Swinburne's consistent research and innovation outputs 
are presented in the updated Swinburne Research Impact Magazine and Swinburne is also renowned for producing favorable academic-industry partnership.

Swinburne was ranked top 100 in the fields of computer science and engineering, automation and control and civil engineering by the Academic Ranking of World Universities in 2021.

Swinburne was also ranked 19th in Australia and in the top 100 in the world for art and design in the 2022 QS World University Rankings, making it one of the top art and design schools.

Swinburne has been placed in the top 200 for computer science engineering, mechanical engineering and civil engineering in Shanghai Ranking's Global Ranking of Academic Subjects in 2019.

The university was listed in the top 50 for art and design subject area by the 2020 QS World Rankings of Universities by Subject.

Swinburne also performed well in the Times Higher Education World University Rankings 2021 with Swinburne ranked in the top 200 for Engineering & technology, top 250 for Computer Science and Physical Sciences. Social Sciences ranked 301-400th, Business & Economics ranked 401-500th and Clinical, pre-clinical & health positioned at 501-600th in 2021. In 2021, Swinburne has improved in the subject areas of physical sciences, business and economics, computer sciences and engineering and technology in the Times Ranking.

Swinburne Business School is a Member of The Centre for Social Impact. Swinburne has won the 2019 Australian Business Award on Business Innovation  of the World Business Awards. Swinburne 's Faculty of Business and Law (Swinburne Business School) ranked in the top 25% Economists and Institutions in Australia and 272nd Business School in the world as of October 2019. Australia's only Graduate School of Entrepreneurship (AGSE) is located in Swinburne. Swinburne Business School issues the quarterly Australian Leadership Index. Swinburne ranked 351-400th in the Business & Management Studies in 2019 by QS World University Rankings, 301-400th 
in Business and Economics in the 2020 Times Higher Education World University Rankings and Business Administration ranked 201-300th by Shanghai Ranking in 2019. There were four Swinburne Master programs that ranked in top 200 worldwide by Eduniversal in 2019. Swinburne's online MBA ranked in the top 35（Tier One）internationally by the CEO Magazine 2019 ranking. Swinburne is affiliated with Globally Responsible Leadership Initiative and accredited by AACSB and Principles for Responsible Management Education (PRME).

Student life

Swinburne Student Union (SSU) 
Swinburne Student Union (SSU) is the independent student representative body of Swinburne University of Technology in Melbourne, Australia. Membership is opt-in for all students.

Faculty

Notable alumni
Garth Davis: film director, Lion (2016)
Houman Younessi: International authority and expert on information technology and biotechnology. 
 Andrew Dominik: film director, Chopper (2000), The Assassination of Jesse James by the Coward Robert Ford (2007), Killing Them Softly (2012), and the documentary One More Time with Feeling (2016).
 Karl von Möller: film director, D'art (2019), Not Quite Hollywood: The Wild, Untold Story of Ozploitation! (2008)
 Mark Hartley: film director, Not Quite Hollywood: The Wild, Untold Story of Ozploitation! (2008)
 Bridget Hustwaite, Triple J radio presenter, television presenter, journalist and author
 Richard Lowenstein: film director, "Autoluminescent" (documentary film on the life of Rowland S. Howard; 2011), He Died with a Felafel in His Hand (2001), Dogs in Space (1986), "Strikebound" (1984)
 L. Scott Pendlebury (1914–1986): landscape and portrait artist; instructor (1946–1963), head of art school (1963–1974) at Swinburne Technical College
 Margaret Jane Gurney (born 1943): Australian artist (Swinburne Technical College)
 Sam Hammington: comedian who is primarily active in South Korea
Amanda Howard: true crime writer and serial killer specialist
David Williamson: Australian dramatist and playwright
Gillian Armstrong: Australian director.

See also

Centre for Astrophysics and Supercomputing
Education in Australia
List of universities in Australia
National Institute of Circus Arts
Prahran Mechanics' Institute

References

External links
University website

 
Technical universities and colleges in Australia
Australian vocational education and training providers
Universities in Melbourne
TAFE Colleges in Melbourne
1992 establishments in Australia
Educational institutions established in 1992
Science and technology in Melbourne
Buildings and structures in the City of Boroondara
Buildings and structures in the City of Knox
Buildings and structures in the City of Maroondah